Faulkes may refer to:

 Dill Faulkes (born 1944), British businessman
 William Faulkes (1863–1933), English musician and composer
 47144 Faulkes, an asteroid named after Dill Faulkes

See also
 Faulks, a surname
 Fawkes (disambiguation)